Al-Shamiya District is a district of  Al-Qādisiyyah Governorate, Iraq. Its seat is the city of Shamiya. It has 4 subdistricts: Al-Shamiya (الشامية), Ghammas (غماس), Al-Aslahea (الصلاحية), and Almhnanwip (المهناوية). The Al-Shamiya branch of the Euphrates river runs through the district. 

Districts of Iraq